Ariel Rauschenberger (born 26 April 1966) is an Argentine politician who served as a National Deputy elected La Pampa from 2017 to 2021. A member of the Justicialist Party, Rauschenberger sat in the Frente de Todos parliamentary bloc from 2019 to 2021.

Rauschenberger served in a number of posts in the provincial government of La Pampa, including as Treasurer General from 1991 to 1991, Minister of Treasury and Finances from 2007 to 2011 and Minister of Government Coordination from 2012 to 2015. He was also a member of the provincial Chamber of Deputies from 2015 to 2017.

Early and personal life
Rauschenberger was born on 26 April 1966 in Bernasconi, a small town in the Hucal Department of La Pampa Province. His father, a member of the Justicialist Party, served as intendente (mayor) of Bernasconi. Rauschenberger studied accountancy at the National University of La Pampa, graduating in 1991. He is married and has one child.

Political career
Rauschenberger's first political post was as Treasurer General of La Pampa Province, having been appointed in December 1991 under Governor Rubén Marín. He was still a university student; he was selected by then-treasury minister, Osvaldo Dadone, because he had the highest average grade of his class. In 1994, Rauschenberger was appointed Secretary of the Treasury and Vice Minister of Economy, and he remained in the post during the governorship of Carlos Verna.

In 2007, Governor Óscar Jorge appointed Rauschenberger as Minister of the Treasury and Finances; he served in that post until 2011. Later, from 2012 to 2015, he served as Minister of Government Coordination.

In 2015, Rauschenberger ran for a seat in the Chamber of Deputies of La Pampa, the unicameral legislature of the province. He was the fourteenth candidate in the Justicialist Party list, which received 48.60% of the vote, enough for Rauschenberger to be elected.

National Deputy
At the 2017 legislative election, Rauschenberger was the first candidate in the Justicialist Party list to the Chamber of Deputies, alongside Melina Delú. The list was the most voted with 45.42% of the vote, and Rauschenberger was elected. He was sworn in on 6 December 2017.

As a national deputy, Rauschenberger formed part of the parliamentary commissions on Economy, Regional Economies and Development, Commerce, Agriculture and Livestock, Budget and Treasury, Science, Technology and Productive Innovation, and Consumer Rights. Rauschenberger was a supporter of the legalization of abortion in Argentina. He voted in favor of the two Voluntary Interruption of Pregnancy bills that were debated by the Argentine Congress in 2018 and 2020, although he initially planned to vote against the first bill, in 2018. Then deputy-Sergio Ziliotto (who was later elected Governor of La Pampa) is widely credited for having convinced Rauschenberger to change his mind.

Ahead of the 2021 primary election, Rauschenberger was confirmed as one of the candidates for re-election in the Frente de Todos list in La Pampa.

References

External links
Profile on the official website of the Chamber of Deputies (in Spanish)

Living people
1966 births
People from La Pampa Province
Members of the Argentine Chamber of Deputies elected in La Pampa
Justicialist Party politicians
20th-century Argentine politicians
21st-century Argentine politicians